Zaragoza is one of the 38 municipalities of Coahuila, a state in north-eastern Mexico. The municipal seat lies at Zaragoza. The municipality covers an area of 8183.5 km². It is near the Mexico–US border with Texas.

Zaragoza has an abundance of natural resources like fluoride, silver and lead. Zaragoza's local economy consists of agriculture, some industry, livestock, tourism and commercial/retail.

It is one of the cities in the "5 manantiales" (5 springs) region in northern Coahuila. The celebrations commemorating Zaragoza's founding on 1 February 1753 are a popular attraction, and feature a traditional "cabalgata" or horse trail ride with horse pulled vintage buggies. On 7 August 1827, the name of the town was changed to San Fernando de Rosas, and to Zaragoza on the 27 February 1868.

Zaragoza has a local cable television system and a local radio station, XHZR-FM.

History

Geography

Adjacent municipalities
Acuña Municipality  (north)
Jiménez Municipality (northeast)
Piedras Negras Municipality (east)
Nava Municipality (southeast)
Morelos Municipality (south)
Múzquiz Municipality (southwest)

Major highways
 Mexican Federal Highway 29

Climate

References

External links
 English Translation "Zaragoza". Enciclopedia de los Municipios de México. Instituto Nacional para el Federalismo y el Desarrollo Municipal.
 Spanish Translation "Zaragoza". Enciclopedia de los Municipios de México. Instituto Nacional para el Federalismo y el Desarrollo Municipal.

Municipalities of Coahuila